Alamgir Kabir (born 1 January 1948) is a Bangladesh Nationalist Party politician and a former Jatiya Sangsad member representing the Naogaon-6 constituency. He also served as the state minister of Housing and Public Works and Women and Children Affairs.

Career
Kabir was elected to parliament from Naogaon-6 as a Bangladesh Nationalist Party candidate in 1991, 1996, 1996, and 2001. In 2007, he was sued for patronizing Jamaat-ul-Mujahideen Bangladesh, an Islamist terror organisation. He was nominated by the Bangladesh Nationalist Party to contest the 11th Jatiya Sangshad elections from Naogaon.

In March 2014, ACC sued Kabir for corruption charges.

References

Living people
1948 births
Bangladesh Nationalist Party politicians
5th Jatiya Sangsad members
6th Jatiya Sangsad members
7th Jatiya Sangsad members
8th Jatiya Sangsad members
State Ministers of Housing and Public Works (Bangladesh)
State Ministers of Women and Children Affairs (Bangladesh)
People from Naogaon District